The exact thin plate energy functional (TPEF) for a function  is 

Minimizing the exact thin plate energy functional would result in a system of non-linear equations. So in practice, an approximation that results in linear systems of equations is often used. At any point where  the first fundamental form  of the surface mapping  is the identity matrix and the second fundamental form  is

.

So the approximate thin plate energy functional is

Rotational invariance 

The TPEF is rotationally invariant.  This means that if all the points of the surface  are rotated by an angle  about the -axis, the TPEF at each point  of the surface equals the TPEF of the rotated surface at the rotated   The formula for a rotation by an angle  about the -axis is   

 

The fact that the  value of the surface at  equals the  value of the rotated surface at the rotated  is expressed mathematically by the equation  

   

where  is the inverse rotation, that is,   So  and the chain rule implies   

 

In equation,  means   means   means  and  means   Equation and all subsequent equations in this section use non-tensor summation convention, that is, sums are taken over repeated indices in a term even if both indices are subscripts.  The chain rule is also needed to differentiate equation since  is actually the composition     

 .    

Swapping the index names  and  yields    

    

Expanding the sum for each pair  yields    

     

Computing the TPEF for the rotated surface yields    

   

Inserting the coefficients of the rotation matrix  from equation into the right-hand side of equation simplifies it to

Data fitting 
The approximate thin plate energy functional can be used to fit B-spline surfaces to scattered 1D data on a 2D grid (for example, digital terrain model data).

 

(where  is the "smoothing parameter") is minimized.  Larger values of  result in a smoother surface and smaller values result in a more accurate fit to the data.  The following images illustrate the results of fitting a B-spline surface to some terrain data using this method.

The thin plate smoothing spline also minimizes equation, but it is much more expensive to compute than a B-spline and not as smooth (it is only  at the "centers" and has unbounded second derivatives there).

References

Splines (mathematics)